Saidulla Musthajab Marikkar, commonly known as S. M. Marikkar, (born 12 January 1977) is a Sri Lankan United National Party politician and current member of Parliament for Colombo District, previously he served as a provincial councilor for the Western Province. Marikkar was also appointed as an electorate organiser for Kolonnawa for the presidential election campaigns that was carried out to support then-common candidate Maithripala Sirisena.

References

External links
 Target-oriented

Living people
Samagi Jana Balawegaya politicians
United National Party politicians
Members of the 15th Parliament of Sri Lanka
Members of the 16th Parliament of Sri Lanka
Sri Lankan journalists
Sri Lankan Muslims
1977 births